The 2015 GCC U-23 Championship was the sixth edition of the GCC U-23 Championship. It took place in Bahrain for the second time. Six nations took part. The competition was held in Riffa from 16 to 29 January. Saudi Arabia won their third title after defeating Kuwait 5–2 in the final.

The 2015 edition was officially known as the Huawei GCC National Teams Under-23 Championship for the second time after the sponsorship deal between Huawei and the AGCFF.

It was initially going to be hosted by Qatar in September 2014, but was later moved to Bahrain and scheduled for January 2015 The group stage draw was held on 4 June 2014.

The semi-final and final were delayed by a number of days due to the death of King Abdullah bin Abdulaziz Al Saud.

Teams
{| class="wikitable sortable"
|-
! Team
! data-sort-type="number"|Previous appearances in tournament
|-
|  (host) || 5 (2008, 2010, 2011, 2012, 2013)
|-
|  || 5 (2008, 2010, 2011, 2012, 2013)
|-
|  || 5 (2008, 2010, 2011, 2012, 2013)
|-
|   || 5 (2008, 2010, 2011, 2012, 2013)
|-
|  || 5 (2008, 2010, 2011, 2012, 2013)
|-
|   || 4 (2010, 2011, 2012, 2013)
|}

Venues

Group stage

Group A

Group B

Knockout stage
In the knockout stage, extra time and penalty shoot-out were be used to decide the winner if necessary (Regulations Articles 10.1 and 10.3).

Bracket

Fifth place play-off

Semi-finals

Third place play-off

Final

Winners

Awards
The following awards were given at the conclusion of the tournament:

Goalscorers

References

External links
GCC U-23 Championship at Goalzz

GCC U-23 Championship
2015
2015 in Asian football
2014–15 in Bahraini football
2014–15 in Qatari football
2014–15 in Saudi Arabian football
2014–15 in Omani football
2014–15 in Kuwaiti football
2014–15 in Emirati football
2015 in youth association football